"Maroon & Gold" is the official fight song of Arizona State University. It was composed by former Director of Sun Devil Marching Band, Felix E. McKernan, in 1948.

Alma mater

"Alma Mater"  was composed by former Music Professor and Director of Bulldog Marching Band, Miles A. Dresskell, in 1937. Current version of the Alma Mater was composed by Hazel Quaid, Dixie Gammage, and Ernest Jerome Hopkins.

See also
 Sun Devil Marching Band

References

External links
 Arizona State University Athletic Bands 
 MP3 of "Maroon and Gold" from http://www.fightmusic.com
 Arizona State University Sun Devil Marching Band recordings of "Maroon & Gold"

American college songs
College fight songs in the United States
Pac-12 Conference fight songs
Arizona State Sun Devils